Fisher v Bell [1961] 1 QB 394 is an English contract law case concerning the requirements of offer and acceptance in the formation of a contract. The case established that, where goods are displayed in a shop, such display is treated as an invitation to treat by the seller, and not an offer. The offer is instead made when the customer presents the item to the cashier together with payment. Acceptance occurs at the point the cashier takes payment.

Facts
The defendant displayed a flick knife in the window of his shop next to a ticket bearing the words Ejector knife – 4s, (i.e. four shillings).

Under section 1 of the Restriction of Offensive Weapons Act 1959 (which was expanded in 1961, after this case finished, to deal with the gap in the law):

In late 1959, the claimant, a chief inspector of police, brought forward information against the defendant alleging he contravened section 1(1) by offering the flick knife for sale.

Judgement

Bristol Justices
At first instance, the Prosecutor submitted that the Defendant has displayed the knife and ticket in the window with the objective of attracting a buyer, and that this constituted an offer of sale sufficient to create a criminal liability under section 1(1) of the Act. Mr Obby Simakampa submitted that this was not sufficient to constitute an offer. The judges at first instance found that displaying the knife was merely an invitation to treat, not an offer, and thus no liability arose. The Prosecutor appealed the judges' decision.

Divisional Court
Lord Parker CJ in the Divisional Court held there was no offence because there was no "offer for sale". Although the display of a knife in a window might at first appear to "lay people" to be an offer inviting people to buy it, and that it would be "nonsense to say that [it] was not offering it for sale", whether an item is offered for the purpose of the statute in question must be construed in the context of the general law of the country. He stated that the general law of the country clearly established that merely displaying an item constituted an invitation to treat. He also read the statute on an exclusive construction (inclusio unius est exclusio alterius), noting that other legislation prohibiting the sale of weapons referred to "offering or exposing for sale" (emphasis added). The lack of the words exposing for sale in the Restriction of Offensive Weapons Act 1959 suggested that only a true offer would be prohibited by the Act. The court dismissed the appeal. Goods displayed in a shop are merely an invitation to treat or invitation to trade.

Ashworth J and Elwes J agreed.

Significance
The 1959 Act was almost immediately amended by the Restriction of Offensive Weapons Act 1961 section 1 to add (to the offence) or exposes or has in his possession for the purpose of sale or hire, which remains the law. A similar shopkeeper would today be successfully prosecuted. The principles of offer and acceptance in the case remain good law.

Draft statute writers, prohibiting certain sales, made almost identical drafting mistakes in Partridge v Crittenden  and British Car Auctions v Wright.

See also
Contract
Offer and acceptance
Invitation to treat
Partridge v. Crittenden (1968) 
British Car Auctions Ltd v Wright (1972)
Pharmaceutical Society of Great Britain v. Boots Cash Chemists (Southern) Ltd. (for an instance of products on a self-service shelf as an invitation to treat) [1953] 1 QB 401, [1953] 2 WLR 427, [1953] 1 All ER 482

References

English contract case law
Court of Appeal (England and Wales) cases
1960 in British law
1960 in case law